Genclerbirliyi Sumqayit was an Azerbaijani professional football club based in Sumqayit from 2003 to 2008.

This list encompasses the major records set by the club and their players in the Azerbaijan Premier League. The player records section includes details of the club's goalscorers and those who have made more than 50 appearances in first-team competitions.

Player

Most appearances 
Players played over 50 competitive, professional matches only. Appearances as substitute (goals in parentheses) included in total.

Overall scorers 
Competitive, professional matches only, appearances including substitutes appear in brackets.

Team

Goals
 Most Premier League goals scored in a season: 32 – 2004–05
 Fewest League goals scored in a season: 16 – 2006-07
 Most League goals conceded in a season: 68 – 2007–08
 Fewest League goals conceded in a season: 28 – 2004-05

Points
 Most points in a season:
33 in 34 matches, Azerbaijan Premier League, 2004–05
 Fewest points in a season:
14 in 26 matches, Azerbaijan Premier League, 2007–08

International representatives

References

FK Genclerbirliyi Sumqayit
records and statistics